Şirinköy is a village in the Gökçeada District of Çanakkale Province in Turkey. Its population is 264 (2021).

References

Villages in Gökçeada District